Statistics of JSL Cup in the 1987 season.

Overview
It was contested by 28 teams, and Nippon Kokan won the championship.

Results

1st round
Fujitsu 2-0 Kawasaki Steel
Mitsubishi Motors 1-1 (PK 4–3) Toyota Motors
Toshiba 4-0 Kofu
Yamaha Motors 3-0 Toho Titanium
Nippon Kokan 4-0 Seino Transportations
Fujita Industries 4-0 Tanabe Pharmaceuticals
All Nippon Airways 3-2 NTT Kansai
Matsushita Electric 3-0 Osaka Gas
Yomiuri 1-3 Sumitomo Metals
Mazda Auto Hiroshima 2-2 (PK 5–4) NTT Kanto
Hitachi 3-0 Cosmo Oil

2nd round
Honda 3-1 Fujitsu
Mitsubishi Motors 1-0 Mazda
Toshiba 1-0 Yamaha Motors
Nippon Kokan 1-1 (PK 5–4) Nissan Motors
Furukawa Electric 1-0 Fujita Industries
All Nippon Airways 1-0 Matsushita Electric
Sumitomo Metals 7-1 Mazda Auto Hiroshima
Hitachi 0-4 Yanmar Diesel

Quarterfinals
Honda 3-0 Mitsubishi Motors
Toshiba 0-3 Nippon Kokan
Furukawa Electric 1-1 (PK 7–8) All Nippon Airways
Sumitomo Metals 2-1 Yanmar Diesel

Semifinals
Honda 0-3 Nippon Kokan
All Nippon Airways 0-0 (PK 3–4) Sumitomo Metals

Final
Nippon Kokan 3-1 Sumitomo Metals
Nippon Kokan won the championship

References
 

JSL Cup
League Cup